Ensalada is the Spanish word for salad.

Ensalada may refer to:

 Ensalada (music), a Spanish Renaissance compositional form similar to the quodlibet
 Kinilnat, an Ilocano vegetable salad

See also
 Ensalada chilena, a Chilean vegetable salad
Ensalada criolla, a 1905 film directed by Eugene Py
 Salad (disambiguation)